Brachyelosoma mindanaonis is a species of beetle in the family Cerambycidae, and the only species in the genus Brachyelosoma. It was described by Breuning in 1958.

References

Apomecynini
Beetles described in 1958
Monotypic Cerambycidae genera